Natar Ungalaaq (born 1959) is a Canadian Inuit actor, filmmaker and sculptor whose work is in many major collections of Inuit art. Before playing the lead roles in Atanarjuat: The Fast Runner (2001) and The Necessities of Life (Ce qu'il faut pour vivre) (2008), Ungalaaq played major roles in other Canadian and American films, including Kabloonak (1995), Glory & Honor (1998) and Frostfire (1994). He is also a producer and director of the Inuit Broadcasting Corporation.

Ungalaaq was the carving buddy of director Zacharias Kunuk. With funds raised by selling their handmade work, they bought their first camera gear in 1981, and started a production company in an Inuit community that didn't even have a TV.

Natar is also a renowned carver. He began when he was 9 or 10 years old, using his grandfather's tools. His carving in white soapstone, "Sedna with a Hairbrush 1985", is featured in the National Gallery of Canada's collection.

In 2016, he made his debut as a director, codirecting the film Searchers with Kunuk.

Filmography

Awards
Ungalaaq was awarded the Best Actor award at the American Indian Movie Awards in 2002 for Atanarjuat. He won the Genie Award for Best Actor at the 29th Genie Awards for his role in Ce qu'il faut pour vivre. He also won the Jutra Award for Best Actor in a Leading Role and the Best Actor award at the Palm Springs International Film Festival for the same performance. In September 2009, Ungalaaq was presented with an award of distinction by the Nunavut Film Development Corporation. This award recognized Natar's body of work and his contribution to Nunavut's film community. In 2016, Ungalaaq won Best Indigenous Language Production (2016) for "Maliglutit (Searchers)" at the ImagineNATIVE Film + Media Arts Festival.

References

External links

Natar Ungalaaq on The Inuit Art Quarterly Profiles 
Natar Ungalaaq on Qaggiavuut

1959 births
Living people
Canadian male film actors
Film directors from Nunavut
Inuit from the Northwest Territories
Canadian male television actors
Inuit filmmakers
Inuit sculptors
Artists from Nunavut
Inuit male actors
Male actors from Nunavut
People from Igloolik
Best Actor Genie and Canadian Screen Award winners
Inuit from Nunavut
Best Actor Jutra and Iris Award winners
21st-century Canadian male actors